Durak-e Shahpuri (also Romanized as Dūrak-e Shāhpūrī; also known as Dūrak) is a village in Mashayekh Rural District, Naghan District, Kiar County, Chaharmahal and Bakhtiari Province, Iran. At the 2006 census, its population was 1000, in 6 families.

References 

Populated places in Kiar County